Eligiusz Gwoździński (21 May 1927 – 9 February 2005) was a former Polish footballer who played as a forward. During his playing career it is known that Gwoździński played for Baltia Gdańsk (now known as Lechia Gdańsk), being apart of the clubs first ever official game. He then played for his hometown club, ŁKS Łódź, where Gwoździński had the most success making 14 appearances for the club in the I liga.

References

1927 births
2005 deaths
Polish footballers
Lechia Gdańsk players
ŁKS Łódź players
Association football forwards